Jinx is a 1919 American silent comedy film starring Mabel Normand and directed by Victor Schertzinger. It is not known whether the film currently survives, which suggests that it is a lost film.

Cast
Mabel Normand as The Jinx
Florence Carpenter as Rory Bory Alice
Ogden Crane as Bull Hogarth
Cullen Landis as Slicker Evans
Clarence Arper as Sheriff Jepson
Gertrude Claire as Aunt Tina Carbery

References

External links

Lantern slide for Jinx 
Lantern slide (Wayback Machine)

1919 films
American silent feature films
American black-and-white films
Films directed by Victor Schertzinger
1919 comedy films
Silent American comedy films
Goldwyn Pictures films
Films with screenplays by Gerald Duffy
1910s American films